Now Radio may refer to:

 Now! Radio, the branding for several Canadian hot adult contemporary radio stations owned by the Jim Pattison Group:
 CHNW-FM in Winnipeg, Manitoba
 CKNO-FM in Edmonton, Alberta
 CKPK-FM in Vancouver, British Columbia
DWAD 1098 AM Now Radio, a radio station in Mandaluyong, Philippines